Barry Cuthbert Jones (6 March 1893 – 1 May 1981) was an actor seen in British and American films, on American television and on the stage.

Biography
Jones was born on Guernsey in the Channel Islands in 1893. He started his acting career on the British stage in 1921. He performed in his first film, Shaw's Arms and the Man as Bluntschli in 1932. In 1935, he originated the role of King Stephen in Ivor Novello's stage musical, Glamorous Night.

A character actor in many films, often portraying nobility, he had a starring role in the film Seven Days to Noon. He also played Mr. Lundie in the 1954 film adaptation of Brigadoon, and Polonius in the 1953 U.S. television adaptation of Hamlet. He appeared as Claudius in Demetrius and the Gladiators, a sequel to 20th Century Fox's biblical epic, The Robe. This character was Caligula's uncle and became the new Emperor after Caligula's death.

Jones died at the age of eighty-eight in Guernsey.

Selected filmography

 Women Who Play (1932) as Ernest Steele
 Number Seventeen (1932) as Henry Doyle
 Arms and the Man (1932) as Captain Bluntschli
 The Gay Adventure (1936) as Darnton
 Murder in the Family (1938) as Stephen Osborne
 Squadron Leader X (1943) as Bruce Fenwick
 Frieda (1947) as Holliday
 Dancing with Crime (1947) as Gregory
 The Calendar (1948) as Sir John Garth
 Uneasy Terms (1948) as Inspector Gringall
 That Dangerous Age (1949) as Arnold Cane
 The Bad Lord Byron (1949) as Colonel Stonhope
 Twelve O'Clock High (1949) as Lord Haw-Haw (voice, uncredited)
 Madeleine (1950) as Lord Advocate
 Seven Days to Noon (1950) as Professor Willingdon
 The Mudlark (1950) as Speaker (uncredited)
 The Clouded Yellow (1951) as Nicholas Fenton
 White Corridors (1951) as Dr. Shoesmith
 Appointment with Venus (1951) as Provost
 The Magic Box (1951) as The Bath Doctor
 Plymouth Adventure (1952) as William Brewster
 Hamlet (1953) as Polonius
 Return to Paradise (1953) as Pastor Corbett
 Prince Valiant (1954) as King Luke
 Demetrius and the Gladiators (1954) as Claudius
 Brigadoon (1954) as Mr. Lundie
 The Glass Slipper (1955) as Duke
 Alexander the Great (1956) as Aristotle
 War and Peace (1956) as Prince Mikhail Andreevich Rostov
 Saint Joan (1957) as De Courcelles
 The Safecracker (1958) as Bennett Carfield
 The 39 Steps (1959) as Professor Logan
 Karolina Rijecka (1961) as Admiral
 A Study in Terror (1965) as Duke of Shires
 The Heroes of Telemark (1965) as Professor Logan (final film role)

Appearances in TV series

  Hallmark Hall of Fame (1953–1961) 
  Robert Montgomery Presents (1955–1956) as Captain Whalley
  The Saint (1963) as Otis Q. Fennick
  Randall and Hopkirk (Deceased) as Patrick Holt
  The Outer Limits (1963) as Dwight Hartley
  Martin Chuzzlewit (1964) as Martin Chuzzlewit the Elder
  The Spread of the Eagle (1963) as Julius Caesar
  Sherlock Holmes (1965) as Charles Augustus Milverton

Sources
Halliwell's Who's Who in the Movies  published by Harper-Collins –

References

External links

1893 births
1981 deaths
20th-century British male actors
British expatriate male actors in the United States
British male film actors
British male stage actors
British male television actors
Guernsey male actors
People educated at Elizabeth College, Guernsey